Kevin Joseph (Kev) Hooper, (9 July 19289 March 1984), was an Australian politician representing the Labor Party.  He was a member of the Legislative Assembly of Queensland for the Electoral district of Archerfield from 1972 till his death in 1984.

Nicknamed "Big Vinnie" after a notorious Mafia informant, he was known for championing the cause of the underdog; he was outspoken in his attacks on illegal prostitution, drugs, gambling, and white-collar crime.

Hooper died after surgery in 1984. He is buried in Mt Gravatt Cemetery.

References

1928 births
1984 deaths
Members of the Queensland Legislative Assembly
20th-century Australian politicians